Gurguri is a village and Union Council of Karak District in Khyber Pakhtunkhwa province of  Pakistan. It is located at 33°17'54N 70°47'11E with an altitude of 902 metres (2962 feet).

References

Populated places in Karak District
Karak District